Achrosis rondelaria is a moth of the family Geometridae first described by Johan Christian Fabricius in 1775. It is found in India, Sri Lanka, Myanmar, Java and Nepal.

The wingspan of the male is 22 mm. Palpi are slender and do not reach beyond the frons. Antennae bipectinate (comb like on both sides) in both sexes to near apex, and branches longer in the male than in the female. Head, thorax, abdomen and forewings are reddish brown with a greyish suffusion. Forewing produced at apex. Hindwings with the reddish-brown costal half and the inner half crossed by a postmedial line. Underside of wings orange red.

References

Moths of Asia
Moths described in 1775
Taxa named by Johan Christian Fabricius